Siogo is the sixth album by the American Southern rock band Blackfoot, released in 1983.  It is the first of two albums featuring former Uriah Heep keyboardist Ken Hensley.

Although the band told their record company that "Siogo" was an Indian word for "closeness" or "togetherness", it is actually an acronym for "Suck It Or Get Out".  According to guitarist Charlie Hargrett, it was  coined by the band's road crew and put up as a sign in the front lounge of their tour bus during previous tours.

"Heart's Grown Cold" is a cover and originally appeared on the 1980 Nazareth album Malice In Wonderland.

Track listing

Personnel
Band members
 Rickey Medlocke - lead vocals, guitars
 Charlie Hargrett - guitars
 Ken Hensley - keyboards, slide guitar on "Drivin' Fool", backing vocals
 Greg T. Walker - bass guitar, backing vocals
 Jakson Spires - drums, percussion, backing vocals

Additional musicians
 Michael Osborne, Lala - backing vocals

Production
 Al Nalli - producer
 Pat Schneider - engineer
 Arnie Rosenberg, Robert Bene, Will Spencer - assistant engineers
 Bob Ludwig - mastering

References 

Blackfoot (band) albums
1983 albums
Atco Records albums